Androstenediol 17β-acetate, or 5-androstenediol 17β-acetate, also known as androst-5-ene-3β,17β-diol 17β-acetate, is a synthetic anabolic-androgenic steroid and an androgen ester – specifically, the C17β acetate ester of 5-androstenediol (androst-5-ene-3β,17β-diol) – which was never marketed.

See also
 List of androgen esters

References

Abandoned drugs
Acetate esters
Androgen esters
Androgens and anabolic steroids
Androstanes
Prodrugs
World Anti-Doping Agency prohibited substances